Rick E. Carter (July 1, 1943 – February 2, 1986) was an American football and baseball player and coach. He served as the head football coach Earlham College  in Richmond, Indiana (1966–1971), Hanover College (1972–1976), the University of Dayton (1977–1980), and the College of the Holy Cross (1981–1985), compiling a career college football coaching record of 137–58–7. His 1980 Dayton Flyers won the NCAA Division III Football Championship after a 14–0 season and a 63–0 victory over Ithaca in the title game. He was named the AFCA College Division Coach of the Year in 1980.

Carter committed suicide after the 1985 season at the age of 42. He had been hospitalized for psychiatric treatment of depression. His father had died of cancer the previous August and his mother was terminally ill but friends claimed he was also upset about his lack of career advancement. In previous years Carter had been offered jobs at several major programs, but Holy Cross would not release him from his contract and those offers had stopped coming. He was survived by his wife and two sons.

Head coaching record

Football

References

1943 births
1986 suicides
American football quarterbacks
Dayton Flyers football coaches
Earlham Quakers baseball coaches
Earlham Quakers baseball players
Earlham Quakers football coaches
Earlham Quakers football players
Hanover Panthers football coaches
Holy Cross Crusaders football coaches
Suicides by hanging in Massachusetts
Sportspeople from Dayton, Ohio